Countess Maria Caroline Charlotte von Spreti, born Baroness von Ingenheim (1704–1749), was a German courtier and the royal mistress of Charles VII, Holy Roman Emperor, from 1719–1723.

Life 
Maria Caroline Charlotte von Ingenheim was daughter of Baron Daniel von Ingenheim, Seigneur de Lorry (1666–1723) and his wife Princess Maria Anna Johanna von Hessen-Wanfried (1685–1764).

In 1723 she married Count Franz Johann Hieronymus Innozenz von Spreti (1695–1772) and had issue. From her liaison with Emperor Charles VII, she was the ancestral mother of the Grafen von Holnstein aus Bayern line.

References
 Franz F. Nöhbauer: Die Wittelsbacher: eine deutsche Chronik, eine europäische Dynastie, Verlag Scherz, 1979, p. 217; (Ausschnittscan)

1704 births
1749 deaths
German ladies-in-waiting
Mistresses of German royalty